Hieroglyphus nigrorepletus is a species of grasshopper in the family Acrididae. It is a highly serious pest of millets such as sorghum and pearl millet in western India.

References

Acrididae
Insect pests of millets